Rag Boli Karnad (also Romanized as Rag Bolī Kārnad) is a village in Bahmai-ye Garmsiri-ye Jonubi Rural District, in the Central District of Bahmai County, Kohgiluyeh and Boyer-Ahmad Province, Iran. As per the 2006 census, its population was 23 distributed among 5 families.

References 

Populated places in Bahmai County